This is a list of music released by Minnesota musician Mark Mallman.

Studio albums

Solo discography

The Odd discography

Ruby Isle discography

Live albums

EPs

Solo discography

Future Wives discography

Singles

Spoken word

Compilation albums

Remix albums

Contributions and other releases

Music videos 
"Tell me How A Man Gets Close to You" (2006)
"Do You Feel Like Breaking Up?" (2008)
"Invincible Criminal" (2009)
"White Leather Days" (2009)
"Mercy Calls" (2009)
"Friday I'm in Love" (2009, with the Varsity 2009 New Years Crew)
"Giant Wave (Phase 1)" (2010)
"The Blood Flow (Phase II)" (2010)
"Liquid Moth (Phase III)" (2010)
"Put Your Collar Up" (2011)
"Pompeii" (2011)
"Minneapolis" (2011)
"Dirty Dishes" (2012)
"Slow the Guillotine" (2013)
"Monster Movies" (2014)
"It's Good To Be Alive" (2016)
"Terrified" (2016)
"The End Is Not The End" (2016)
"I Love You, I Steal Your Gas" (2017, with Dick Valentine)
"Peace On Earth" (2018, with Lazerbeak)
"Quarantined" (2020)
"Reverse Paradise" (2020)
"We Are We" (2020)
"Fake Gold Silver Chains" (2021)
"The Beauty Is Alive" (2021)
"For Love I Will Let Love Go" (2021)
"Happiness" (2021)

With Ruby Isle 
"Into the Black" (2007)
"Teenage Riot" (2007)
"How it Hurts" (2008)
"White Winter Hymnal" (Fleet Foxes cover) (2009)
"Skinny Love" (Bon Iver cover) (2009)
"The Rake's Song" (The Decemberists cover) (2009)
"My Girls (Animal Collective cover) (2009)
"Short Fuse" (Black Lips cover) (2009)
"Now We Can See" (The Thermals cover) (2009)
"Elbo.ws2Megamix" (2009)
"So Damn High" (Free Maxi Mix) (2009)
"So Damn High" (Will Eastman Club Edit) (2010)
"Night Shot" (Invasion of the Pussy Snatchers remix) (2010)
"Mr. Brownstone" (Guns N' Roses cover) (2010)
"My Michelle" (Guns N' Roses cover) (2010)
"All the Angles" (2010)

With Waxx Maxx 
"Phenomena" (2010)
"Eaten Alive" (2010)
"Carnival of Souls" (2011)

Movies 
 With or Without You (1998) ... Co-worker

References 

Rock music discographies